Sophie Chatel is a Canadian politician who was elected to represent the riding of Pontiac in the House of Commons of Canada in the 2021 Canadian federal election. Prior to being elected, she was a civil servant.

Education and career 
Sophie Chatel received a Bachelor of Laws from the Université de Montréal in 1994 and a Master of Taxation from the Université de Sherbrooke in 1997. She is also a member of the Chartered Professional Accountants of Canada. 

Sophie Chatel spent six years as a tax advisor in the private sector. From 2002 to 2008, she was a Senior Officer and later a Senior Advisor at the Canada Revenue Agency, where her experience included negotiating tax treaties, reviewing Canada’s model tax treaty, and working on advance rulings on international tax matters. Starting in 2008, Sophie Chatel worked at the federal Department of Finance, where she served as Associate Chief, Tax Treaties and International Tax. In 2017, she was appointed Head of the Tax Treaty Unit in the OCED's Centre for Tax Policy and Administration.

Family 
Sophie Chatel is the mother of two twin boys. Her husband teaches global history at the University of Ottawa.

Politics 
Sophie Chatel was announced as the Liberal candidate for the 2021 election a few days after the former MP, Will Amos, announced he would not be seeking reelection amid controversy. 

Her election as the Member of Parliament for Pontiac made Sophie Chatel the first woman to represent the riding. She has stated that her priorities as MP include fighting climate change and build a green and prosperous Outaouais, and improving internet and cell phone connectivity throughout the Pontiac.

In December, 2021, Chatel was named a member of the Standing Committee on Finance.

Electoral record

References

External links

Living people
Year of birth missing (living people)
Liberal Party of Canada MPs
Members of the House of Commons of Canada from Quebec
Women in Quebec politics
Women members of the House of Commons of Canada
21st-century Canadian women politicians
21st-century Canadian politicians